Stenoeme is a genus of beetles in the family Cerambycidae, containing the following species:

 Stenoeme aguilari Galileo & Martins, 2010
 Stenoeme annularis Martins, 1980
 Stenoeme bellarmini Gounelle, 1909
 Stenoeme iheringi Gounelle, 1909
 Stenoeme kempfi Martins, 1980

References

Xystrocerini